Cloth of gold or gold cloth (Latin: Tela aurea)  is a fabric woven with a gold-wrapped or spun weft—referred to as "a spirally spun gold strip".  In most cases, the core yarn is silk, wrapped (filé) with a band or strip of high content gold.  In rarer instances, fine linen and wool have been used as the core.

History

Cloth of gold has been popular for ecclesiastical use for many centuries. Under Henry VII of England, its use was reserved to royalty and higher levels of nobility. It is also used today by companies such as Charvet for neckwear.

Few extant examples have survived in Roman provincial tombs.  Later producers of cloth of gold include the Byzantine Empire and Medieval Italian weavers, particularly in Genoa, Venice and Lucca. Dating from the 1460s the Waterford cloth-of-gold vestments are made from Italian silk woven in Florence. The panels were embroidered in Bruges which was the centre of the medieval embroidery industry. A similar cloth of silver was also made. It is still made in India and Europe today.

Other
 Cloth of gold is not to be confused with various goldwork embroidery techniques that date back to antiquity, though the type of goldwork thread called "passing" is identical to the weft thread of cloth of gold.
 Most modern metallic fabrics made in the West are known as lamé.
 Cloth of gold is a familiar name occasionally applied to the venomous Conus textile species of cone shell.
 Tilsent is a luxurious silken cloth interwoven with flattened threads of gold or silver.

Images

See also
 Field of the Cloth of Gold
 Samite

References

 The Roman Textile Industry and Its Influence.  A Birthday Tribute to John Peter Wild. Edited by Penelope Walton Rodgers, et al.

Bibliography
 Joycelyne Gledhill Russell: The Field of Cloth of Gold: Men and Manners in 1520. Routledge & Kegan Paul, London 1969

External links
 

Woven fabrics